Bai Fan (born May 4, 1962) is a Chinese actor who has starred in various genres of film and television series.  He is well known for Ren Changxia (2005), Crime Domain (2008), No 1 Landmark (2010), Beijing Love Story (2012) and Sha Mo Qing Shen Zhi Wu Yue Hua Kai etc.

Filmography

Television series

Film

Advertisement
 Melatonin (脑白金)
 Sen Jia Lin Flooring (森嘉林地板)
 Yanghe Spirit Classic Series (洋河蓝色经典)

References

External links
 Bai Fan Chinese Wiki
 

1962 births
21st-century Chinese male actors
Chinese male film actors
Chinese male television actors
Living people
Male actors from Chongqing